Messehallen is a convention center located in the St. Pauli district of Hamburg, Germany. The site has a total of  indoor floor area. The center hosts trade shows, concerts and other events. It is run by Hamburg Messe und Congress, which is also managing Congress Center Hamburg.

Trade fairs 

Notable trade fairs include Hanseboot, Internorga‎ and SMM Hamburg.

Music events 
Notable past performers include AC/DC, Whitesnake, Judas Priest, Ozzy Osbourne and Iron Maiden.

References

External links 

Website of the operating company

Fairgrounds
Convention centres in Germany
Buildings and structures in Hamburg-Mitte